Acontias lineatus, the striped dwarf legless skink or lined lance skink, is a species of lizard in the family Scincidae. It is found in South Africa and Namibia.

References

Acontias
Reptiles described in 1879
Taxa named by Wilhelm Peters